B-Reel Films (also known as BR•F) is an independent film production company founded in 1995 in Stockholm, Sweden. BR•F was a sister company of B-Reel but is now its own group. BR•F operates from offices in Los Angeles and Stockholm, working across commercials, feature films and television, documentaries, branded content, interactive and music videos.

History 
BR•F grew out of the Swedish TV production company Spader Knekt - later called St Paul - which was founded in 1995 by Fredrik Heinig and two partners. In 1999, Pelle Nilsson, Anders Wahlquist and Petter Westlund founded the digital production company B-Reel and Fredrik Heinig and Johannes Åhlund (who then was a partner in St Paul) became partners in the company.

In 2009, they all started a new film production and became B-Reel Films. Today, B-Reel and B-Reel Films are two separate groups with two different ownership constellations.

High-profile projects 
 Darling (film from 2007)
 Palme (documentary film from 2012)
 Hotell (film from 2013)
 Drifters (Tjuvheder) (film from 2015)
 Before We Die (TV series 2017–2019)
 Euphoria (film from 2018)
 Goliath (film from 2018)
 X&Y (film from 2018)
 Mannen som lekte med elden (documentary film from 2018)
 Bergman: A Year in a Life (documentary film from 2018)
 Midsommar (film from 2019)
 I Am Greta (documentary film from 2020)
 I Am Zlatan (film from 2021)
 Lena (upcoming documentary 2021)

Awards 
BR•F has won EFA Statuette (European Film Awards), several Cannes Lions Grand Prix, an Emmy and over a dozen Swedish Academy Awards (Guldbagge Awards).

References 

Film production companies of Sweden
Documentary film production companies
Swedish companies established in 1995
Television production companies of Sweden